Jercules "Jojo" Tangkay (born November 26, 1976 in Aloguinsan, Cebu) is a professional basketball player who last played for the ARQ Builders–Lapu-Lapu City Heroes of the Pilipinas VisMin Super Cup. He was drafted 16th overall by the Sta. Lucia Realtors in the 2001 PBA draft.

Career
Tangkay made the roster of Southwestern University Cobras on his freshman year after he offered to try out with them. He became the Cebu Amateurs Athletic Association's MVP in 2000. He was drafted 16th overall by Sta. Lucia Realtors in 2001. However, his height hindered his development and affected his playing time with the team. In 2002, he was signed by the Talk 'N Text Phone Pals, but only played 14 games before he was released.

Disappointed by his failure to make a breakthrough in the PBA, Tangkay signed a contract with Welcoat Paint Masters in the Philippine Basketball League to resurrect his career. He became one of the league's superstars and earned two MVP awards.

When Welcoat acquired the PBA's Shell franchise in 2006, he was re-signed for a new contract to play in the PBA after a great season with them in the semi-professional league. In 2008, he was waived by the team.

He played with M. Lhuillier Cebu Ninos of Liga Pilipinas.

External links
 Player Profile
 PBA-Online! Profile

References

1976 births
Filipino men's basketball players
Living people
Basketball players from Cebu
Rain or Shine Elasto Painters players
Cebuano people
Shooting guards
Sta. Lucia Realtors players
TNT Tropang Giga players
Maharlika Pilipinas Basketball League players
Sta. Lucia Realtors draft picks